The Labour Party (in Turkish: Emek Partisi, EMEP) is a communist party in Turkey. Its chairman is Ercüment Akdeniz. The party was founded as Emek Partisi (Labour Party, EP) in 1996. Due to its ban by the Constitutional Court, it was refounded with the name Emeğin Partisi (Party of Labour, EMEP), the same year. In 2005, the name "Emek Partisi" was reinstalled after the European Court of Human Rights held the ban was a violation of Article 11 of the European Convention on Human Rights.

Its ideological stance is in accord with the line of ICMLPO. In its programme, EMEP identifies its goal as creating a "Independent and Democratic Turkey".

The party publishes the daily Evrensel.

The party is one of the participants in the People's Democratic Congress, a political initiative instrumental in founding the Peoples' Democratic Party in 2012. It is one of the few political parties in Turkey that recognize the Armenian deportations of 1915 as genocide.

Electoral results
The party participated in 1999 General Elections, getting 51,756 votes, i.e. 0.17% of the total vote. In 2007 EMEP became a constituent party in the Thousand Hopes Alliance formed around DEHAP. The aim of the alliance was to present its candidates to the Turkish Parliament as independents in order to circumvent the 10% threshold which has been introduced in the Turkish Constitution in 1982. At the 2007 General Elections the party gathered 26,574 votes i.e. 0.08%.

Split in the Peoples' Democratic Party (HDP)

The Labour Party (EMEP) had been a member of the Peoples' Democratic Congress and had participated in the establishment of the HDP in 2012. However, the EMEP released a statement on 17 June 2014, announcing a split with the HDP. The split was attributed to the restructuring of the Kurdish nationalist Peace and Democracy Party into a local-only party under the new name Democratic Regions Party (DBP), while the BDP's parliamentary caucus would be integrated into the HDP. This would, in turn, require the HDP's constitution to be altered in order to ensure greater compliance and conformity with the ideology of the BDP. This caused the EMEP to formally announce their secession from the HDP, but stated that they would continue their participation with the HDK. Despite the split, the Labour Party endorsed the HDP presidential candidate Selahattin Demirtaş for the 2014 presidential election and also announced that they would not be running in the June 2015 general election.

References

External links
Labour Party Official website
The Working Class Movement in Turkey and The Party of Labour Presentation at the official website (March 2006)
Evrensel Daily Newspaper (in Turkish)
Evrensel Daily Newspaper Europe Edition (Some pages in German)

1996 establishments in Turkey
Communist parties in Turkey
European Court of Human Rights cases involving Turkey
Far-left politics in Turkey
Hoxhaist parties
International Conference of Marxist–Leninist Parties and Organizations (Unity & Struggle)
Labour parties
Peoples' Democratic Congress
Political parties established in 1996
International Meeting of Communist and Workers Parties